{{DISPLAYTITLE:C19H22O2}}
The molecular formula C19H22O2 (molar mass: 282.38 g/mol) may refer to:

 1,4,6-Androstatrien-3,17-dione
 Cannabivarin
 Dianethole
 Mestilbol
 Vedaprofen
 17β-Methyl-17α-dihydroequilenin